Martha Friedman is a sculptor and college professor residing in New York City. Her work has been exhibited throughout the world in both solo and group exhibitions. Her primary exhibitor is Wallspace in New York. She has taught classes at The Cooper Union, Pratt Institute, Princeton University, Rutgers University, Wesleyan University and Yale University.

Solo exhibitions

2012
 Caught, Wallspace, New York, NY

2010
 Museum of Contemporary Art Detroit, MI
 DeCordova Museum and Sculpture Park, Lincoln, MA
 Shane Campbell Gallery, Chicago, IL

2009
 The Organization of Batter, Wallspace, New York, NY

2007
 Not Simply Connected, Wallspace, New York, NY

Group exhibitions

2010
 Rock Garden, Salon 94 Freemans, New York, NY
 Herd Thinner-organized by David Hunt, Charest-Weinberg Gallery, Miami, NY

2009
 New York Minute—organized by Kathy Grayson, MACRO, Rome
 In the Between—organized by Suzanne Egeran, Istanbul, Turkey
 Offset—curated by Matthew Spiegelman, Mt Tremper Arts, Mt Tremper, NY
 Time-Life Part Two, Taxter & Spengemann, New York, NY
 From Yarn to Yucca-A Continuation of the Dialogue Between Abstraction and Figuration, John Connelly Presents, New York, NY
 Submerging Artists—curated by General Store, The Dark Fair, Koelnischer Kunstverein, Cologne, Germany
 Presents, Rowley Kennerk Gallery, Chicago

2008
 The Station—curated by Nate Lowman and Shamim M, Momim, Miami, FL
 Public Art Fund at Metrotech, Metrotech Center, Brooklyn, NY
 Lost in the Supermarket, Armand Bartos Fine Art, New York, NY
 Thank You for Coming Triple Candie, Triple Candie, New York, NY

2007
 Bunch, Alliance and Dissolve, Contemporary Art Center, Cincinnati, OH

2006
 Mystic River II, Arcadia University Art Gallery, Glenside, PA.
 EAF 06, Socrates Sculpture Park, Long Island City, NY
 Mystic River, curator Noah Sheldon, SouthFirst Gallery, Brooklyn, NY
 Space Between The Spokes, KS Art, New York, NY
 Dynasty, curator Omar Lopez-Chahoud, Gallery MC, New York, NY

2005
 Excitations curator Matt Keegan, Andrew Kreps Gallery, New York, NY
 North Drive Press Issue 2, collaboration with Rachel Harrison

2004
 The Reality of Things, Triple Candie, New York, NY
 Buy American, curator Joe Scanlan, Galerie Chez Valentin, Paris, France
 G C G, Art in the Office, 22 Courtland St. New York, NY

Reviews and publications
 "500 Words: Martha Friedman," Artforum.com, September 10, 2010.
 Douglas, Sarah, “Summer in the City: Group Shows,” Artinfo, July 24, 2009
 Robinson, Walter, “Weekend Update,” Artnet, July 22, 2009
 Rochelle Steiner and Abigail Clark, Trapdoor, Public Art Fund, April 2009.
 Momin, Shamim M., “Future Greats,” Art Review, March 2009.
 Vogel, Carol, ‘Inside Art: Appetite For Sculpture,’ The New York Times, November 7, 2008
 ‘Bunch, Alliance and Dissolve, exhibition catalogue, November, 2006
 Saltz, Jerry, ‘The Undead of Art History,’ The Village Voice, October 30, 2006
 Fry, Naomi, ‘EAF06: 2006 Emerging Artist Exhibition,’ Critics’ Pick, Artforum.com Oct 6, 2006
 Alemani, Cecilia, ‘Mystic River,’ Critics’ Pick, ArtForum.com, May 31, 2006
 ‘Mystic River’ exhibition catalogue, May 2006
 Cotter, Holland, ‘Art in Review: Mystic River,’ The New York Times, May 19, 2006
 ‘Dynasty’ exhibition catalogue, March 2006
 ‘ETC.’ exhibition catalogue, September 2005
 Cotter, Holland, ‘Art in Review: ‘Justin Lowe,’ The New York Times, August 5, 2005
 Johnson, Ken, ‘The Reality of Things,’ The New York Times, June 18, 2004
 Ammirati, Domenick, ‘Art in the Office,’ Critics’ Picks, ArtForum.com, April 13, 2004
 Selbach, Gerard, ‘Buy American,’ Paris Art, March 6, 2004

References
 http://www.publicartfund.org/pafweb/projects/08/trapdoor/friedman/friedman-08.html
 http://www.wallspacegallery.com/artists.html?id=2,9&cv=1

1975 births
Living people
21st-century American sculptors
Artists from Detroit
School of the Art Institute of Chicago alumni
Yale University alumni
Cooper Union faculty
Pratt Institute faculty
Princeton University faculty
Rutgers University faculty
Wesleyan University faculty
Yale University faculty
Sculptors from Michigan